Deuces Wild is an album by saxophonist Sonny Stitt recorded in 1966 and released on the Atlantic label. The album featured Robin Kenyatta's recording debut. The 4 Stitt organ trio tracks can be found as bonus tracks to the My Mother's Eye's CD

Reception

In his review for Allmusic, Jim Todd stated "The performances are concise, blues-based blowing numbers. What they lack in compositional refinement they make up for in energetic execution".

Track listing 
All compositions by Sonny Stitt except as indicated
 "Deuces Wild" - 5:25     
 "My Foolish Heart" (Ned Washington, Victor Young) - 4:44     
 "Blues Ahead" - 4:18     
 "Sittin' in with Stitt" - 4:01     
 "In the Bag" (Robin Kenyatta) - 6:21     
 "Me 'n' You" (Kenyatta) - 3:19     
 "Pipin' the Blues" (Rufus Harley, Stitt) - 5:50

Personnel 
Sonny Stitt - alto saxophone, tenor saxophone
Wilmer Mosby (AKA Don Patterson) - organ
Billy James - drums
Robin Kenyatta - alto saxophone (track 5), soprano saxophone (track 6)
Rufus Harley - tenor saxophone, and bagpipes (track 7)

References 

1967 albums
Atlantic Records albums
Sonny Stitt albums
Albums produced by Joel Dorn